Disney's Nine Old Men were Walt Disney Productions' core animators, some of whom later became directors, who created some of Disney's most famous animated cartoons, from Snow White and the Seven Dwarfs (1937) onward to The Rescuers (1977), and were referred to as such by Walt Disney himself.  They worked in both short films and feature films. Disney delegated more and more tasks to them in the animation department in the early 1950s when their interests expanded and diversified their scope. Eric Larson was the last to retire from Disney, after his role as animation consultant on The Great Mouse Detective in 1986. All members of the group are deceased, and are acknowledged as Disney Legends.

History
The nine were all hired by Disney in the 1920s and 1930s, working initially on Disney's shorter productions, and later on theatrical projects. All nine were present by the release of Snow White and the Seven Dwarfs (1937). According to researcher Neal Gabler and animator Frank Thomas, a board was formed to study all possible problems affecting the company in relation to its work between 1945 and 1947. One day in the early 1950s, Disney named the nine members on the board "Nine Old Men". Disney delegated more and more tasks to them in the field of animation as the work of the company diversified. As well as being honored as Disney Legends in 1989, all of the Nine Old Men were separately honored with the Winsor McCay Award (the lifetime achievement award for animators) during the 1970s and 1980s.

They began to retire one by one from the 1970s, with Eric Larson's 1986 animation consultancy for The Great Mouse Detective being the group's last animation work at Disney. Frank Thomas and Ollie Johnston in particular continued on outside of Disney for some time, and were credited on several films in the 1980s and 1990s, including The Chipmunk Adventure (1987), Little Nemo: Adventures in Slumberland (1992) and The Iron Giant (1999). A documentary which interviewed the duo, entitled Frank and Ollie was released by Disney in 1995. They were honoured with a final voiced cameo in The Incredibles in 2004, which was produced by Disney but animated by a then-independent Pixar. Ollie Johnston, the last surviving member of the group, died in 2008.

Members
Les Clark (November 17, 1907 – September 12, 1979), "The Mickey Mouse Master", who joined Disney in 1927. Although Clark started his career at Disney working on the Alice comedies' shorts, his specialty was animating Mickey Mouse as he was the only one of the Nine Old Men to work on that character from its origins with Ub Iwerks. Les did many scenes throughout the years, animating up until Lady and the Tramp. He moved into directing and made many animated featurettes and shorts, although since 1964 almost all the films in which Clark worked are short films.
Marc Davis (March 30, 1913 – January 12, 2000) started in 1935 on Snow White, and later he went on to develop/animate the characters of Bambi and Thumper (in Bambi), Tinker Bell (in Peter Pan), Maleficent, Aurora and the raven (in Sleeping Beauty), and Cruella de Vil (in One Hundred and One Dalmatians). From 1961 Davis restricted his duties to his work at Disneyland. Davis was responsible for character design for both the Pirates of the Caribbean and Haunted Mansion attractions at Disneyland.
 Ollie Johnston (October 31, 1912 – April 14, 2008), who joined Disney in 1935, first worked on Snow White. He went on to author the animator's bible The Illusion of Life with Frank Thomas. His work includes Mr. Smee (in Peter Pan), the Stepsisters (in Cinderella), the District Attorney (in The Adventures of Ichabod and Mr. Toad), and Prince John (in Robin Hood). According to the book The Disney Villain, written by Johnston and Frank Thomas, Johnston also partnered with Thomas on creating characters such as Ichabod Crane (in The Adventures of Ichabod and Mr. Toad) and Sir Hiss (in Robin Hood).
Milt Kahl (March 22, 1909 – April 19, 1987) started in 1934 working on Snow White. His work included heroes such as Pinocchio (in Pinocchio), Tigger (in The Many Adventures of Winnie the Pooh), Peter Pan (in Peter Pan), and Slue-Foot Sue (in Melody Time) and villains such as Madam Mim (in The Sword in the Stone), Shere Khan (in The Jungle Book), Edgar the butler (in The Aristocats), the Sheriff of Nottingham (in Robin Hood), and Madame Medusa (in The Rescuers).
Ward Kimball (March 4, 1914 – July 8, 2002) joined Disney in 1934 and retired in 1974. His work includes Jiminy Cricket (in Pinocchio), Lucifer, Jaq and Gus (in Cinderella), and the Mad Hatter and Cheshire Cat (in Alice in Wonderland). Specialized in drawing comic characters, his work was often more "wild" than the other Disney animators. In 1968 he created and released a non-Disney anti-Vietnam War animated short, Escalation.
Eric Larson (September 3, 1905 – October 25, 1988) joined in 1933. One of the top animators at Disney, he animated notable characters such as Peg in Lady and the Tramp; the Vultures in The Jungle Book; Peter Pan's flight over London to Neverland (in Peter Pan); and Brer Rabbit, Brer Fox, and Brer Bear (in Song of the South). Because of Larson's demeanor and ability to train new talent, Larson was given the task to spot and train new animators at Disney in the 1970s. Many of the top talents at Disney in later years were trained by Eric in the 1970s and 1980s.
 John Lounsbery (March 9, 1911 – February 13, 1976) started in 1935 and, working under Norm "Fergy" Ferguson, quickly became a star animator. Lounsbery, affectionately known as "Louns" by his fellow animators, was an incredibly strong draftsman who inspired many animators over the years. His animation was noted for its squashy, stretchy feel. Lounsbery animated J. Worthington Foulfellow and Gideon in Pinocchio; Ben Ali Gator in Fantasia; George Darling in Peter Pan; Tony, Joe, and some of the dogs in Lady and the Tramp; Kings Stefan and Hubert in Sleeping Beauty; The Elephants in The Jungle Book; and many others. In the 1970s, Louns was promoted to Director and co-directed Winnie the Pooh and Tigger Too and his last film, The Rescuers.
 Woolie Reitherman (June 26, 1909 – May 22, 1985) joined Disney in 1933 as an animator. In the late 1950s, Reitherman was promoted to director. He produced all the animated Disney films after Walt's death until his retirement. He also directed a sequence in Sleeping Beauty which featured Prince Phillip's escape from Maleficent's castle and his eventual battle against her as a terrible fire-breathing dragon. Some of his work includes Monstro (in Pinocchio), The Headless Horseman (in The Adventures of Ichabod and Mr. Toad), the Crocodile (in Peter Pan), and the Rat (in Lady and the Tramp).
Frank Thomas (September 5, 1912 – September 8, 2004) joined Disney in 1934. He went on to author the animator's bible The Illusion of Life with Ollie Johnston. His work included Lady Tremaine (in Cinderella), the Queen of Hearts (in Alice in Wonderland), and Captain Hook (in Peter Pan). Frank also was responsible for the iconic spaghetti scene in Lady and the Tramp.

In 2012, Frank Thomas' son, Theodore Thomas, produced a documentary featuring the children of the animators remembering their fathers, Growing up with Nine Old Men (included in the Diamond edition of the Peter Pan DVD).

Legacy

Books and influence 
In 1982, after retiring, Johnston and Thomas published the book Disney Animation: The Illusion of Life, which sets out the 12 basic principles of animation and helps to preserve the animation techniques that the Disney company created.

Another important component of the Nine Old Men's legacy are the many animators in the contemporary animation industry who can directly or indirectly trace their training to someone who was either their apprentice at Disney Animation or their student at CalArts.  For example, Wayne Unten, the supervising animator for Elsa in Disney's Frozen, has noted that he apprenticed with John Ripa, who in turn apprenticed with Glen Keane, who in turn apprenticed with Johnston.

Basic principles of animation 
As part of their work for Disney, the Nine Old Men refined the 12 basic principles of animation:
 Squash and stretch
 Anticipation
 Staging
 Straight Ahead Action and Pose to Pose
 Follow Through and Overlapping Action
 Slow In and Slow Out
 Arcs
 Secondary Action
 Timing
 Exaggeration
 Solid Drawing
 Appeal

Feature films

Notes

References

Further reading

 
 
 
 
 
  
 
 
 

Walt Disney Animation Studios people
Fantasy artists
Disney-related lists
Nonets
Nicknames in film